Five-time defending champion Rafael Nadal defeated Fernando Verdasco in the final, 6–0, 6–1 to win the singles tennis title at the 2010 Monte-Carlo Masters. It was his first title in 11 months, and he lost only 14 games and no sets en route to the title.

Seeds
The top eight seeds receive a bye into the second round.

Draw

Finals

Top half

Section 1

Section 2

Bottom half

Section 3

Section 4

Qualifying

Seeds

Qualifiers

Draw

First qualifier

Second qualifier

Third qualifier

Fourth qualifier

Fifth qualifier

Sixth qualifier

Seventh qualifier

External links
 Main draw
 Qualifying draw

Singles